Events from the year 1731 in Canada.

Incumbents
French Monarch: Louis XV
British and Irish Monarch: George II

Governors
Governor General of New France: Charles de la Boische, Marquis de Beauharnois
Colonial Governor of Louisiana: Étienne Perier
Governor of Nova Scotia: Lawrence Armstrong
Commodore-Governor of Newfoundland: Henry Osborn

Events
 1731: Fort St. Pierre on Rainy Lake established by Christopher Dufrost de La Jemeraye and Jean Baptiste de La Vérendrye. This was the first fort in La Verendrye's expansion of the "Posts of the West".
 1731-43: The La Verendrye family organize expeditions beyond Lake Winnipeg and direct fur trade toward the east.

Births
Richard Dobie, an early Canadian businessman and a sometimes partner of Benjamin Frobisher (died 1805).
 November 7: Robert Rogers, army officer and author (died 1795).

Deaths
Robert Chevalier Beauchêne, adventurer in New France.

Historical documents

Pennsylvania lieutenant governor forwards 1718 study of French trade routes and "their Indians" and means to "prevent the designs of the French"

Pennsylvania lieutenant governor says his province and New York worry French are co-opting their frontiers and Indigenous people on them

New York vulnerable to French, who have fort at Crown Point, priests, and "people that runn amongst the Indians and are much like them"

New Hampshire survey finds "no Indians" in N.H. and some in eastern Massachusetts, and "extreamly numerous" French in Canada and Cape Breton

How Newfoundland fits into trade network of Middle Atlantic colonies, Indigenous people, Britain, Spain, Portugal and West Indies

Board of Trade advised that Newfoundland justice of the peace and fishing admiral have distinctly different powers, with former superior to latter

"The ignorant people are possess'd" - Clout of fishing admirals and others makes enforcement formidable for Newfoundland governor and justices

"The fear we are in" - Newfoundland justices of the peace characterize Irish Catholics and transported felons as especially dangerous

Nova Scotia has few English (besides military), no Blacks and about 800 Acadian families, who "are increas'd near one half" in 10 years

To avoid settlement delay, Nova Scotia leadership suggests simultaneous survey of forests reserved for Navy and land to be open to settlers

Nova Scotia acknowledges dependence on French currency and Boston paper money, and limited food resources with settlers expected

Nova Scotians claiming land that is unworked must show why it should not be disposed of for benefit of Crown and "fresh settlers"

"Ungovernable people" - Lieutenant governor distrusts holders of old French land grants, and thinks Acadian justices would inform on rest of Acadians

Nova Scotia Council agrees unanimously that Boston company should be allowed to mine coal at site near Cape Chignecto

Preponderant New England property owners prevent proper settlement in Canso, and thus schooners prevail over in-shore fishing

Canso fishery also varies from Newfoundland's because no inhabitants are involved (except in salt curing) and no servants nor soldiers fish

Prompted by 1731 Nova Scotia letter, Board of Trade notes "complaints of the very bad manner in which the Canso fish is cured"

Armstrong informs Council of his instructions "forbiding laying any Duty on Negroes or ffelons [sic] imported into this province

Surveyor of His Majesty's Woods in Maine finds "gentry" have "stragling manner of settlement" that provokes "insults of the Indians"

Dunbar warns "Indian deeds" imply "ye Indians have a right to dispose of all ye rest of ye lands" (while they say lands are inalienable)

Decision coming on Massachusetts claim to Nova Scotia land west of Penobscot River, but Dunbar should still add settlements east of there

Tract of land between Kennebec and St. Croix rivers determined to be under government of Massachusetts, and settler land claims there valid

References

 
Canada
31